Central Community High School is a high school in unincorporated area in Clinton County, Illinois, near Breese. It is a part of Central Community High School District #71.

History
The high school and district formed in 1971 as a consolidation of the high schools of Breese and Aviston.

In 2016 the school's enrollment went over 559, which was above the 557 needed to join the 3A athletic league for basketball of both male and female teams; it was previously in 2A.

Attendance boundary
The  territory is mostly in Clinton County and includes small parts of Bond and Madison counties. Municipalities in its territory are, aside from Breese and Aviston, Albers, Bartelso, Beckemeyer, Damiansville, and Germantown. An unincorporated area served is St. Rose.

References

External links
 Central Community High School
School districts in Illinois
Education in Bond County, Illinois
Education in Clinton County, Illinois
Education in Madison County, Illinois
1971 establishments in Illinois
Educational institutions established in 1971